Sabbatha Rahzuardi or known as Sabbatha (born in Jakarta, on May 28, 1977). Sabbatha is a former Indonesian fashion accessories designer. Raised in a family of artists, Sabbatha started his career in 2005 as a fashion designer for accessories and handbags namely Sabbatha. Since 2016 until today, Sabbatha is more as an origami visual 3D art and interior design decoration, with Sabbatha Origami.

History 
After completing his education at Paris Sorbonne IX Dauphine France, in 2001, Sabbatha decided to stay, settle, and build his career in Bali. In 2014 Sabbatha began to venture into the world of origami visual arts.

References 

1977 births
Living people
Indonesian fashion designers
People from Bali
Origami artists